UFC Brazil: Ultimate Brazil (also known as UFC Ultimate Brazil or UFC 17.5) was a mixed martial arts event held by the Ultimate Fighting Championship in São Paulo, Brazil on October 16, 1998. The event was seen on pay-per-view in the United States and Brazil, and was later released on home video.

History
Ultimate Brazil was the first appearance of the UFC in Brazil, and the second UFC event to take place outside the US. The event was arranged through the initiative of Sérgio Batarelli, former Kickboxing and Vale Tudo fighter, promoter of the International Vale Tudo Championship, WVC (World Vale Tudo Championship) and manager of multiple Brazilian MMA fighters. Ultimate Brazil marked the first UFC event (other than UFC 9) to not utilize the tournament format which, aside from UFC 23, was abandoned completely in following events. The event featured the first ever UFC Lightweight Championship fight, as well as a Middleweight Championship fight.

Ultimate Brazil was part one of what the UFC called "The Road To The Heavyweight Title" (not to be confused with the event of the same name), a tournament of sorts, spanning four events, to crown the new UFC Heavyweight Champion following Randy Couture's relinquishing of the belt.

UFC Brazil marked the first appearance of Pedro Rizzo, who would go on to become a top UFC heavyweight contender. The event also featured the first UFC appearance of future PRIDE Middleweight Champion Wanderlei Silva in a fight against former UFC 12 heavyweight tournament champion and future UFC Light Heavyweight Champion Vitor Belfort. Belfort became the first person to knock Silva out, with an impressive 44 second knockout after a barrage of punches.

Results

See also 
 Ultimate Fighting Championship
 List of UFC champions
 List of UFC events
 1998 in UFC

References

External links
UFC Brazil results at Sherdog.com
Quinze anos depois: os bastidores do primeiro UFC de São Paulo e do Brasil - History of the UFC Brazil (Portuguese)

Ultimate Fighting Championship events
1998 in mixed martial arts
Mixed martial arts in Brazil
Sport in São Paulo
1998 in Brazil